Andrew S. Ward (born 1946) is an American writer of historical nonfiction.

He is a former contributing editor to Atlantic Monthly, commentator for National Public Radio's All Things Considered and columnist for The Washington Post''''. He lives in Seattle, Washington.

Works
 Fits and Starts: The Premature Memoirs of Andrew Ward, Little-Brown (1978), 
 The Blood Seed, McGraw-Hill (1987), 
 Out Here: A Newcomer's Notes from the Great Northwest, Penguin (1992), 
 Our Bones are Scattered: The Cawnpore Massacres and The Indian Mutiny Of 1857, Henry Holt and Co. (1996), 
 Dark Midnight When I Rise: The Story of the Jubilee Singers, Amistad (2001), 
 River Run Red: The Fort Pillow Massacre in the American Civil War, Penguin (2006), 
 The Slaves' War: The Civil War in the Words of Former Slaves'',  Houghton Mifflin (2008),

References 

Living people
1946 births
American reporters and correspondents
21st-century American historians
Historians from Washington (state)
Oberlin College alumni
21st-century American male writers
American male non-fiction writers
20th-century American male writers
20th-century American historians
Writers from Seattle